Joka is a locality in South West Kolkata, India. It is a part of greater Behala region. This place is mostly known for Indian Institute of Management Calcutta and ESI-PGIMSR,ESIC Medical College and Hospital.

Administration
Joka and part of Pailan-Daulatpur (adjoining area of Joka) are a part of the Kolkata Municipal Corporation. The area is under jurisdiction of the Haridevpur Police Station and Thakurpukur Police Station of South West Division (Behala Division) of Kolkata Police.

Geography
Joka is bordered by Thakurpukur to the north, Pailan to the south, Asuti Maheshtala to the west and Nepalgunge, Rania to the East.

Joka composed of many small areas like Diamond Park, Nabapally, 22 Bigha, Yani Sarani, Check Post, Sri Bardhan Pally, Hanspukur, Rasapunjo, Kalua, Sonar Bangla etc.

Demographics
As per 2011 Census of India Joka had a total population of 9,302, of which 4,645 (50%) were males and 4,657 (50%) were females. Population below 6 years was 763. The total number of literates in Joka was 7,803 (91.38% of the population over 6 years).

Kolkata urban agglomeration
The following municipalities and census towns in the South 24 Parganas district were part of the Kolkata Urban Agglomeration in the 2011 census: Maheshtala (M), Joka (CT), Balarampur (CT), Chata Kalikapur (CT), Budge Budge (M), Nischintapur (CT), Uttar Raypur (CT), Pujali (M) and Rajpur Sonarpur (M).

Transport
Joka is well connected with the rest of Kolkata by the 4-lane Diamond Harbour Road (NH 12) and  4 lane James Long Sarani.

There is another road called "Bakhrahat Road" which connects joka with some parts of south 24 paraganas like Bakhrahat, Bibirhat, Nodakhali, Dakshin raypur, Amtala, Burul, Pujali, Budge Budge etc.

Joka-BBD Bagh Metro railway constructions are expected to be operational by 2022.

The old Joka Tram depot is now closed and tram services no longer exist.

Bus routes include-

Private Bus
12C Pailan — Howrah Station (via Behala, B.N.R.)
12C/1A Konchowki — Howrah Station
12C/1B Pailan — Howrah Station (via Kabardanga, Haridevpur, Tollygunge, Rabindra Sadan)
83 Falta — Babughat
210 Raichak — Esplanade (Express Bus)
235 Amtala — Salt Lake Karunamoyee
75 Raipur — Babughat (Via Bakhrahat Road, Thakurpukur bazar, Behala, khidirpore, Esplanade)
SD8 Bibirhat — Nandi Bagan (Via Bakhrahat Road, Thakurpukur bazar, Mominpur, Hazra, Gariahat, Ballygunge)

Mini Bus
11A Diamond Park — Howrah Maidan
131 Joka — Ruby Hospital
Thakurpukur-Sealdah (Bus starts from diamond park)
Thakurpukur-Bagbazar (Bus starts from diamond park )

SD Bus Route
SD5 Sonarpur — Khariberia
SD9 Esplanade — Noorpur
SD9/1 Esplanade — Noorpur
SD14 Taratala — Sahararhat
SD16 Sirakole — Mukundapur
SD18 Esplanade — Diamond Harbour/South Bishnupur/Raidighi
SD19 Esplanade — Patharpratima / Gangadharpur
SD22/1 Esplanade — Nainan Sector 4
SD27 Dostipur — Akrafatak
SD31 Taratala — Jhinki Hat
SD76 Amtala — Ruby Hospital

CSTC bus routes
AC4B Joka – New Town (via Kabardanga, Tollygunge, Rashbehari, Gariahat, Ruby Hospital, Science City, SDF)
AC4R Joka-Ruby Crossing
EB2 Joka-Ballygunge
AC12D Howrah Station — Joka
AC52 Howrah Station — Amtala
S3W Joka — Ecospace (Aliah University) (via Thakurpukur, Behala, Taratala, New Alipore, Chetla, Rashbehari, Gariahat, Ruby Hospital, Science City, SDF, New Town, Narkelbagan)
Joka - Balurmath

CTC Bus
C8 Joka – Barasat via Kabardanga, Haridevpur, Tollygunge, Rashbehari, Gariahat, Ruby Hospital, Science City, SDF, New Town, Narkelbagan, Eco Park, City Centre 2, Airport, Madhyamgram
C14/1 Joka – Madhyamgram via Kabardanga, Haridevpur, Tollygunge, Rashbehari, Gariahat, Ruby Hospital, Science City, Ultadanga, Baguihati, Airport, B.T. College
C37 Amtala – Howrah Station
C38 Joka – Howrah Station
C46 Nabanna – Baruipur via Khidderpore, Behala, Thakurpukur, Amtala, Sirakole, Dhamuah, Surjapur, Sarberia
E45 Joka – Digha via Kabardanga, Haridevpur, Tollygunge, Rashbehari, Esplanade, Santragachi, Dhulagarh, Mecheda, Nandakumar, Henria, Contai, Ramnagar

VS Series (WBSTC AC Volvo Bus)
VS6 Esplanade — Diamond Harbour

WBSTC Non AC
ST25 Esplanade — Ramganga
ST26 Esplanade — Usthi
ST27 Esplanade - Kakdwip/Patharpratima Bazar
ST28 Esplanade — Namkhana
ST29 Esplanade — Dhola
ST32 Esplanade — Bakkhali
ST37 Esplanade - Raidighi

Ola Shuttle

Falta-Kasba
Joka-Infospace
Joka-Ecospace
Joka-Sector 5
Joka-Salt Lake (to Yuba Bharat krirangan during 2017 under-17 football world cup)

Auto Rickshaw
Joka-Taratala
Joka- Majerhat
Thakurpukur-Amtala
Thakurpukur-Pailan

Economy
In accordance with the recent developments in Joka, mainly Joka-BBD Bagh metro, the area has started to develop rapidly. Projects like Genexx Valley, Imperial Riddhi Siddhi have come up, providing housing facilities. Joka has also seen a rise in Retail and fast food chain - Domino's being a prominent player in the area. ESIC hospital is also located in Joka, serving the residents in the area with all the medical facilities.

Culture
This locality houses one of the important centers of the Bratachari movement containing Gurusaday Museum.

Education

Joka has the Indian Institute Of Management Calcutta (IIMC), India's first IIM established by Govt. Of India in the year 1969.

Schools in the area include Vivekanada Mission School, Pailan World School and Kendriya Vidyalaya, Kolkata Model School,St Mary's Convent School,Children Academy High School,Joka perfect school,St. Gregorios School,Gurukul Vidya Mandir Secondary School,Kalua Primary School,Ideal Mission School,St. Andrews Public School,El Bethel School.

Ministry of Labour & Employment has started a Medical College in this area (in the campus of erstwhile ESIC Joka Model Hospital) since 2013.

Notable residents
Bir Bahadur Chettri (Gold Medalist in Field hockey at the 1980 Summer Olympics)
Srabanti Chatterjee (Tollywood film actress)
Soham Chakraborty(Tollywood film actor)

References

Neighbourhoods in Kolkata
Kolkata Metropolitan Area